In mathematics, a Jackson q-Bessel function (or basic Bessel function) is one of the three q-analogs of the Bessel function introduced by . The third Jackson q-Bessel function is the same as the Hahn–Exton q-Bessel function.

Definition

The three Jackson q-Bessel functions are given in terms of the q-Pochhammer symbol and the basic hypergeometric function  by

They can be reduced to the Bessel function by the continuous limit:

There is a connection formula between the first and second Jackson q-Bessel function:

For integer order, the q-Bessel functions satisfy

Properties

Negative Integer Order
By using the relations:

we obtain

Zeros
Hahn mentioned that  has infinitely many real zeros.

Ratio of q-Bessel Functions
The function  is a completely monotonic function.

Recurrence Relations
The first and second Jackson q-Bessel function have the following recurrence relations (see  and ):

Inequalities
When , the second Jackson q-Bessel function satisfies:

(see .)

For , 

(see .)

Generating Function
The following formulas are the q-analog of the generating function for the Bessel function (see ):

 is the q-exponential function.

Alternative Representations

Integral Representations
The second Jackson q-Bessel function has the following integral representations (see  and ):

where is the q-Pochhammer symbol.  This representation reduces to the integral representation of the Bessel function in the limit .

Hypergeometric Representations
The second Jackson q-Bessel function has the following hypergeometric representations (see):

An asymptotic expansion can be obtained as an immediate consequence of the second formula.

For other hypergeometric representations, see .

Modified q-Bessel Functions
The q-analog of the modified Bessel functions are defined with the Jackson q-Bessel function ( and ):

There is a connection formula between the modified q-Bessel functions:

For statistical applications, see .

Recurrence Relations
By the recurrence relation of Jackson q-Bessel functions and the definition of modified q-Bessel functions, the following recurrence relation can be obtained ( also satisfies the same relation):

For other recurrence relations, see .

Continued Fraction Representation
The ratio of modified q-Bessel functions form a continued fraction:

Alternative Representations

Hypergeometric Representations
The function  has the following representation:

Integral Representations
The modified q-Bessel functions have the following integral representations:

See also
q-Bessel polynomials

References

Special functions
Q-analogs